North Carolina elected its members August 11, 1825 after the term began but before the new Congress convened.

See also 
 1825 North Carolina's 2nd congressional district special election
 1824 and 1825 United States House of Representatives elections
 List of United States representatives from North Carolina

1825
North Carolina
United States House of Representatives